The following article presents a summary of the 2010–11 football (soccer) season in Croatia, which was the 20th season of competitive football in the country.

National teams

Croatia

Croatia U21

Croatia U19

Croatia U17

League tables

Prva HNL

Druga HNL

Croatian clubs in Europe

Summary

Dinamo Zagreb

Hajduk Split

Šibenik

Cibalia

References